Allison Margaret Morris  (born 1945) is a retired New Zealand criminologist, specialising in youth justice, restorative justice and women in crime. She was elected a Fellow of the Royal Society Te Apārangi in 2000.

Education 
Morris earned a PhD from the University of Cambridge in 1976.

Career 
Morris was appointed as Lecturer in Criminology at Cambridge University in 1976, and promoted to Reader in Criminal Justice in 1995. She left the university in 1998. Morris was a full professor at Victoria University of Wellington before her retirement in 2001. She was elected a Fellow of the Royal Society Te Apārangi in 2000. The Society said Morris has "been recognised internationally as an outstanding criminologist whose evidence-led work, characterised by meticulous data collection, has had global influence. In her special field of the area of youth justice she has made New Zealand a virtual world laboratory for youth justice and her work is currently influencing policy in Australia and Britain as well as in New Zealand."

Selected publications

References 

Alumni of the University of Cambridge
Academics of the University of Cambridge
Academic staff of the Victoria University of Wellington
Fellows of the Royal Society of New Zealand
1945 births
Living people